Wolfgang Amadeus Mozart's String Quartet No. 1 in G major, K. 80/73f, was completed in its original three-movement form on 15 March 1770 while touring in Lodi, Lombardy. Mozart was 14 at the time. The fourth movement was added later, possibly in 1773, when Mozart and his father visited Vienna. There is a theory surrounding who this piece is in the style of, and many say the Italian cellist and composer Luigi Boccherini was the primary influence for this string quartet.

Movements
In contrast to the Milanese Quartets, this quartet is in four movement form:
Adagio, 
Allegro, 
Menuetto, trio in C major, 
Rondeau: [Allegro],

References

External links 
 
 

1
1770 compositions
Compositions in G major